Juan Manuel Vargas Risco (born 5 October 1983) is a Peruvian retired footballer that played as a left back.

Vargas' previous clubs include Universitario, Colón, Catania, Genoa and Fiorentina. He played for Peru at international level. His last team was Universitario de  Deportes.

Club career

Early career
Vargas received his start in the popular Peruvian team Universitario, where he quickly earned a main spot in the team by 2004, given his great play and his crowd-pleasing goals at key moments. In 2005, he transferred to Argentine club Colón.

Catania
In August 2006, Vargas signed a four-year contract with Catania. He scored his first goal for Catania on 31 October 2007, in the 88th minute, tying Siena 1–1 and prolonging Catania's unbeaten streak to seven matches. During his two-year stay in Sicily, he was continuously one of their best players and was a first-team regular. His performances helped the Sicilians to Serie A survival for two seasons. These impressive displays led to elite clubs around Europe chasing after the 23-year old's signature.

Fiorentina
On 17 May 2008, it was reported Vargas had agreed to sign for Real Madrid, but on 5 July 2008, he joined Fiorentina for a fee of €12 million. Upon arriving in Florence, he struggled in the left back position and was highly criticized. However, after realizing his true potential as an attacking midfielder, he became a crucial part of the Viola squad providing crucial assists, giving the squad great speed and acting almost as a third forward. On 24 November 2009, Vargas scored a critical spot kick goal that advanced Fiorentina onto the knock-out stages in the UEFA Champions League. This was the first time Fiorentina made it to the round of 16 in ten years.

On the last day of the August 2012 transfer window, Vargas joined Serie A club Genoa on loan for the season, making 20 appearances before rejoining Fiorentina. He scored Fiorentina's goal in their 1–3 defeat to Napoli in the 2014 Coppa Italia Final.

Real Betis
On 12 August 2015, Vargas signed a two-year deal with Real Betis, newly promoted to La Liga, after his contract with Fiorentina expired. He made his debut for the club on 23 August, starting in a 1–1 home draw against Villarreal.

On 31 August 2016, Vargas terminated his contract.

Style of play
Vargas plays at left back, on the wing, or in the midfield, in both offensive and defensive positions. Vargas impresses with his ability to dribble the ball and make remarkable shots on goal. He is also known for his free-kick ability and accurate crosses. His former Fiorentina teammate Alberto Gilardino stated that Vargas is probably the best crosser he has played with.

International career
Vargas played his first match with the Peru national team against Paraguay in 2006 FIFA World Cup qualifying, with Paulo Autuori as head coach. He scored his first international goal on 12 September 2007 in a friendly match against Bolivia. He was sent off in the 2011 Copa América semi-final match for elbowing a Uruguayan player.

Personal life
Vargas currently lives with his longtime partner Blanca Rodríguez, and their three children: Luana Mia (born in 2007), Ánika Lía (born 28 December 2009), and Juan Manuel (born in 2011).

Career statistics

Club

International
.

International appearances and goals

Statistics accurate as of match played

Honours

Club

Fiorentina
Coppa Italia: Runners-up 2013–14

International
Peru national team
Copa America: Bronze medal 2011
Copa America: Bronze medal 2015

References

External links
 
 
 
 
 Argentina Primera statistics at Fútbol XXI  

1983 births
Living people
Footballers from Lima
Association football fullbacks
Association football wingers
Association football utility players
Peruvian footballers
Peruvian Primera División players
Club Universitario de Deportes footballers
Argentine Primera División players
Club Atlético Colón footballers
Serie A players
Catania S.S.D. players
ACF Fiorentina players
Genoa C.F.C. players
La Liga players
Real Betis players
2011 Copa América players
Peru international footballers
Peruvian expatriate footballers
Expatriate footballers in Italy
Expatriate footballers in Argentina
Expatriate footballers in Spain